Rullepølse (rolled sausage) is a traditional Danish cold cut.  A piece of pork belly—variants use beef flank or lamb—is flattened out and is spread with herbs and seasoning (salt, pepper, allspice), chopped onions, and in some variants, parsley.  It is then rolled up and placed in a brine for a number of days, before being placed in a special press, cooled, and sliced thinly.  It is often use on rugbrød to make the traditional Danish open-faced sandwich, smørrebrød, usually garnished with a thick slice of sky and rings of raw onion.

Similar items also exist in a Swedish version, rullsylta, and a Norwegian version, ribberull, which is made of a lamb shoulder - boned, flattened, sewn to form a long rectangle, rolled, pressed, and steamed.

See also

References

Pork dishes
Danish cuisine
Lunch meat